Rosemarie Said Zahlan (August 20, 1937 – May 10, 2006) was a Palestinian-American Christian historian and writer on the Arab states of Persian Gulf. She was a sister of Edward Said. In addition to her books, she also wrote for the Financial Times, the Middle East Journal, the International Journal of Middle East Studies and the Encyclopedia of Islam.

Biography
Rosemarie was born in Cairo in 1937, as the eldest of four sisters. Her father, Wadie Said, was a wealthy Anglican Palestinian businessman and a US citizen, while her mother was born in Nazareth to a Christian family of Palestinian descent. She attended the women's college, Bryn Mawr,  United States, where she took a degree in musicology. In a serious car accident her hands were injured and several vertebrae were broken. This made a musical career playing the piano impossible.

After Bryn Mawr, Rosemarie taught for a while in Cairo. She then went to Beirut, where she lectured on cultural history and music at the American University of Beirut and the Beirut College for Women. After Beirut, she went to London to get her PhD (about the Red Sea route to India and its 18th-century history pioneer, George Baldwin) at the School of Oriental and African Studies.

Rosemarie married Tony Zahlan, a Palestinian physicist and academic from Haifa. Together they championed the Gaza Library Project for supplying books to Palestine. Rosemarie was also a patron of the Palestine Solidarity Campaign in Britain, and, according to The Times, her  "abiding concern throughout her life was for Palestine and the suffering of the Palestinian people."

Bibliography
Zahlan, A. B.; Said Zahlan, Rosemarie: Technology Transfer and Change in the Arab World: The Proceedings of a Seminar of the United Nations Economic Commission for Western Asia  Oxford, United Kingdom: Published for the United Nations by Pergamon Press, 1978
Said Zahlan, Rosemarie:  The Origins of the United Arab Emirates.  A Political and Social History of the Trucial States  Macmillan, NY, 1978
Said Zahlan, Rosemarie:  The Creation of Qatar.  London: Routledge 1979 (reprinted, 1989)
Said Zahlan, Rosemarie:  The Making of the Modern Gulf States: Kuwait, Bahrain, Quatar, the United Arab Emirates and Oman.  Ithaca Press, 1998,

See also
Palestinian Christians

References

Rosemarie Said Zahlan: Historian of the Gulf states whose heart was in Palestine, Obituary by Victoria Brittain, The Guardian, May 16, 2006
Rosemarie Zahlan: Expert on the Gulf states and defender of the Palestinians Obituary, The Times,  2006

External links
Book Review  by Brooks Wrampelmeier, in the Middle East Policy Council

1937 births
2006 deaths
Bryn Mawr College alumni
American people of Palestinian descent
American people of Lebanese descent
Middle Eastern studies in the United States
Academic staff of the American University of Beirut
Academic staff of Lebanese American University
American people of Egyptian descent
Palestinian Christians
Palestinian academics
20th-century Palestinian historians
Palestinian people of Lebanese descent
Writers from Cairo
20th-century Palestinian women writers
Women historians
Rosemarie